Oleksandr Sobkovych (born February 11, 1976) is a Ukrainian footballer who serves as a player-assistant coach for FC Ukraine United in the Canadian Soccer League.

Career 
Sobkovych began his career in 1992 with FC Dynamo-3 Kyiv in the Ukrainian Football Amateur League, and also played with FC Dynamo-2 Kyiv in the Ukrainian First League. He later had stints with FC Hoverla Uzhhorod, and FC CSKA Kyiv. In 1997, he played in the Ukrainian Premier League with FC Metalurg Mariupol. In 1998, he returned to the First League to play with FC Chornomorets Odesa, and spent some time in the Second League with FC Sokil Zolochiv in 2000. In 2002, he returned to the Premier League to play with FC Obolon Kyiv. In 2003, he went abroad to play in the Kazakhstan Premier League with FC Ordabasy.

Throughout his time in Kazakhstan he played with FC Atyrau, and FC Astana-1964. In 2005, he returned to Ukraine to play with FC Dnipro Cherkasy, and went abroad in 2017 to serve as player-assistant coach for FC Ukraine United in the Canadian Soccer League. In his debut season he assisted FC Ukraine in achieving a perfect season, and claimed the CSL Second Division Championship.

References 

1976 births
Living people
Ukrainian footballers
FC Dynamo-3 Kyiv players
FC Dynamo-2 Kyiv players
FC Hoverla Uzhhorod players
FC CSKA Kyiv players
FC Mariupol players
FC Chornomorets-2 Odesa players
FC Chornomorets Odesa players
FC Sokil Zolochiv players
FC Obolon-2 Kyiv players
FC Obolon-Brovar Kyiv players
FC Ordabasy players
FC Atyrau players
FC Astana players
FC Dnipro Cherkasy players
FC Ukraine United players
Ukrainian Premier League players
Kazakhstan Premier League players
Canadian Soccer League (1998–present) players
Association football defenders
Association football midfielders
Ukrainian Second League players